Trachydium is a genus of flowering plants belonging to the family Apiaceae.

Its native range is Afghanistan to Southern Central China and Indo-China.

Species:
 Trachydium cambodgianum (H.Boissieu) M.Hiroe 
 Trachydium involucellatum R.H.Shan & F.T.Pu

References

Apioideae
Apioideae genera